The State of Liberty is a proposed U.S. state to be formed out of Eastern Washington. Enabling legislation was introduced in the Washington State House of Representatives in January 2019. It was proposed  by Washington State Representative Matt Shea as House Memorials in 2015 and 2017, and was the subject of the Douglas County Republicans' "Lincoln Day dinner" keynote speech in May 2018 at the Wenatchee Convention Center. In early 2021, a bill (House Bill 1239) calling for the creation of a new state called Liberty was proposed by Republicans Rob Chase and Bob McCaslin. The bill was also co-sponsored by Republicans Robert Sutherland and Tom Dent.

See also
51st state
Cascadia (independence movement)
Jefferson (proposed Pacific state)
Lincoln (proposed Northwestern state)

References

Further reading

External links
HB 1509 - 2019-20 Establishing the new state of Liberty, Washington State Legislature
https://libertystate.org/

2019 in Washington (state)
Liberty